Tomoya Yagi (八木 智哉, born November 7, 1983, in Yokohama) is a Japanese former professional baseball pitcher in Japan's Nippon Professional Baseball. He won the Pacific League Rookie of the Year Award in 2006. He played for the Hokkaido Nippon-Ham Fighters, Orix Buffaloes, and Chunichi Dragons from 2006 to 2017.

External links

NBP

1983 births
Chunichi Dragons players
Hokkaido Nippon-Ham Fighters players
Japanese baseball players
Living people
Nippon Professional Baseball pitchers
Nippon Professional Baseball Rookie of the Year Award winners
Orix Buffaloes players
People from Yokohama